Samuel Hulmes (1879–1920) was an English footballer who played in the Football League for Bury and Lincoln City.

References

1879 births
1920 deaths
English footballers
Association football defenders
English Football League players
Lincoln City F.C. players
Gillingham F.C. players
Rochdale Town F.C. players
Rossendale United F.C. players
Nelson F.C. players
Bury F.C. players